Stefania [in all languages except for Polish pronounced like Ste-pha-knee-ah] is a female name in Belarusian, Bulgarian, Croatian, Czech, Greek, Stefánia Hungarian, Italian, Romanian, Polish, Serbian, Macedonian, Slovak, Slovene, Ukrainian and Russian, originating from Old Greek  meaning crowned or the winning.

People

Stefania Ascari (born 1980), Italian politician
Stefania Barr (born 1994), American actress and musician
Stefania Belmondo (born 1969), Italian cross country skier
Stefania Berton (born 1990), Italian pair skater
Stefania Calegari (born 1967), Italian competitive ice dancer
Stefania Dovhan, Ukrainian-American soprano
Stefania Elfutina (born 1997), Russian competitive sailor
Stefanía Fernández Krupij (born 1990), 2009 Miss Universe, a Venezuelan of Ukrainian and Galician descent
Stefania Follini (born 1961), Italian interior designer who holds the world record for the longest period in isolation by a woman
Stefania Górska (1907–1986), Polish actress, composer, singer and dancer
Stefania Grodzieńska (1914–2010), Polish writer, stage actress and satirist
Stefania Jabłońska (born 1920), Polish physician and professor emeritus
Stefania Liberakakis (born 2002), Greek/Dutch singer and actress
Ștefania Mărăcineanu (1882-1944), Romanian physicist
Stefania Podgórski, (born 1925), Polish righteous among the nations
Stefania Prestigiacomo (born 1966), Italian politician, member of the Chamber of Deputies of Italy
Stefania Sandrelli (born 1946), Italian actress
Ștefania Stănilă, (born 1997), Romanian gymnast
Stefania Stanuta (1905-2000), Belarusian actress
Ștefania Vătafu (born 1993), Romanian footballer
Stefania Spampinato (born 1982), Italian actress

Places
Stefania, Greater Poland Voivodeship (West-central Poland)
Stefania, Łódź Voivodeship (Central Poland)

Art
"Stefania", song by Ukrainian folk-rap group Kalush Orchestra

Name days
December 27 in Greece  
December 26 in Italy 
September 18 in Poland 
November 24 in Russia 
November 28 in Hungary
December 26 in Czech Republic
December 27 in Romania

See also
Stephanie
Ștefan (name)

References

Bulgarian feminine given names
Serbian feminine given names
Slovene feminine given names
Croatian feminine given names
Polish feminine given names
Italian feminine given names
Czech feminine given names
Slovak feminine given names
Romanian feminine given names
Russian feminine given names
Ukrainian feminine given names
Hungarian feminine given names
Greek feminine given names
Sammarinese given names